is a Japanese politician of the Liberal Democratic Party, a member of the House of Councillors in the Diet (national legislature). A native of Nichinan, Miyazaki and graduate of Nippon Medical School, he was elected for the first time in 2004.

References

External links 
 Official website in Japanese.

1948 births
Living people
Members of the House of Councillors (Japan)
Liberal Democratic Party (Japan) politicians